HŽRK Zrinjski Mostar is a Croat-founded women's handball team from the city of Mostar, Bosnia and Herzegovina.

The club plays in the Handball Championship of Bosnia and Herzegovina. It is part of the Zrinjski Mostar sport society. It has been one of the most successful women's handball clubs in the country since the formation of the national league in 2001.

Fans of HŽRK Zrinjski are known as Ultras.

History
The club was founded by Bosnian Croats in 1992. The team dominated women's handball in Herzeg-Bosnia. From 1994 to 2001, they won eight titles, also winning three titles in the playoffs of the Championship of Bosnia and Herzegovina. In 2001 a new united national league was formed with Zrinjski winning the inaugural season.

Season 2012-13 was very successful for the team with the title returning to Mostar. In European competitions, Zrinjski played in the quarterfinals of the EHF Challenge Cup, which was a historic success for the club, and for women's handball in Bosnia and Herzegovina.

Honours
Handball Championship of Bosnia and Herzegovina:  
Winners (7): 1998, 1999, 2000, 2002, 2005, 2006, 2013
Runner-up (2): 2003, 2004
Handball Cup of Bosnia and Herzegovina:
Runner-up (1): 2012
First League of Federation of Bosnia and Herzegovina:
Winners (1): 2019
Herzeg-Bosnia Championship:
Winners (8): 1994, 1995, 1996, 1997, 1998, 1999, 2000, 2001
Cup of Herzeg-Bosnia:
Winners (8): 1994, 1995, 1996, 1997, 1998, 1999, 2000, 2001

European record

Recent seasons

The recent season-by-season performance of the club:

Key

Notable players

 Ivana Ljubas

Coaching history

 Zvonko Papak
 Ana Papak
 Marijana Arapović
 Tina Biokšić

References

External links
 EHF Club profile
 Zrinjski website 

Bosnia and Herzegovina handball clubs
Sport in Mostar
Croatian sports clubs outside Croatia